State Route 71 (SR 71) is a north–south state highway in Tennessee. For most of the length it is a "hidden" route, as it coincides with US 441 in all but a short section in Knoxville. The road begins at the North Carolina state line in Sevier County within the Great Smoky Mountains National Park at Newfound Gap and ends at an intersection with US 25W, SR 116, and SR 9 (hidden) in Rocky Top. Along its length SR 71 passes through Sevier County, a small portion of Blount County, Knox County, Anderson County, and in and out of Campbell County. Despite being signed on Hall of Fame Parkway in Knoxville, Tennessee, the Knox County TDOT map ignores SR 71 while SR 33 has a concurrency with US 441.

Route description

SR 71 begins concurrent with US 441 within the Great Smoky Mountains National Park at the North Carolina state line on  Newfound Gap. SR 71 is known as Newfound Gap Road within the park, and follows along a valley carved by the West Prong of the Little Pigeon River as a narrow and curvy 2-Lane highway. Newfound Gap Road then becomes concurrent with SR 73 Scenic (Little River Road) before having an interchange with the Gatlinburg Bypass and entering the city of Gatlinburg, where US 441/SR 71/SR 73 Scenic leaves the park and becomes Parkway, a 4-lane undivided highway as it passes through the city. Parkway then has an intersection with US 321/SR 73 (East Parkway), where SR 73 Scenic ends and US 321/SR 73 joins Parkway. Parkway heads north to have another  interchange with the Gatlinburg Bypass before leaving Gatlinburg and becoming a divided highway known as the Foothills Parkway Spur (more commonly known as The Spur). Parkway then enters the city of Pigeon Forge and widens to a 6-lane. It passes through the city and has an intersection with SR 449 (Dollywood Lane/Veterans Boulevard) before US 321/SR 73 head north along Wears Valley Road. US 441/SR 71 (Parkway) then crosses a bridge over the West Prong of the Little Pigeon River to enter Sevierville. They pass by several tourist attractions and a Tanger Outlets before again crossing the West Prong of the Little Pigeon River and turning of the Parkway and north onto Forks of the River Parkway at the southern edge of downtown. They bypass downtown on the west side as an undivided highway before coming to an intersection with SR 66 (Winfield Dunn Parkway) and US 411/SR 35 (W Main Street), where US 441/SR 71 turns left to become concurrent with US 411/SR 35 as a 4-lane undivided highway known as Chapman Highway. Chapman Highway then crosses a bridge over West Prong of the Little Pigeon River and leaves Sevierville as a divided highway through rural areas. It then passes through some mountainous areas as an undivided highway before entering Seymour. Chapman Highway passes by several homes and businesses before coming to an intersection with SR 338 (Boyds Creek Highway), where US 411/SR 35 heads south along Maryville Highway. US 441/SR 71 (Chapman Highway) continues north to pass through a small portion of Blount County before leaving Seymour and crossing into Knox County.

Knox County

US 441/SR 71 (Chapman Highway) passes through suburban areas as it enters South Knoxville. It has an interchange with SR 168 (Governor John Sevier Highway) before passing through a business district. SR 71 then breaks off from US 441 and follows E Moody Avenue for a few blocks before joining South Knox Boulevard (signed as James White Parkway) at an interchange with its current southern end. SR 71 then heads north as a freeway and has interchanges with Cottrell Street, Sevier Avenue, and Hillwood Avenue before crossing a bridge over the Tennessee River to enter downtown Knoxville. SR 71 then turns west and leaves James White Parkway, which continues as SR 158, and follows the adjoining exit ramp for Riverside Drive, Hill Avenue, Hall of Fame Drive; even through SR 71 is signed as a primary highway along SR 158. This the only section where SR 71 sign is posted. SR 71 then follows Hall of Fame Drive north through downtown, running parallel to SR 158 (James White Parkway), and has an intersection with US 11/US 70/SR 1 (E Fifth Avenue/Magnolia Avenue) before having an interchange with I-40 (Exit 389). It then becomes concurrent with US 441/SR 33 (Broadway) at an interchange. Broadway continues north as a 4-lane undivided highway through neighborhoods and suburban areas before having an intersection with SR 331 (Old Broadway) and an interchange with I-640/US 25W/SR 9 (Exit 6) and entering Fountain City. Broadway has a partial interchange with SR 331 (Tazewell Pike) before it passes through a business district before passing through downtown. It then becomes a divided highway as it crosses a ridge, where it leaves Fountain City and Knoxville to enter Halls Crossroads. Broadway now becomes Maynardville Pike and passes through suburban areas and business districts before US 441/SR 71 splits off from SR 33 (Maynardville Pike) along Norris Freeway as a 4-lane undivided highway shortly before having an intersection with SR 131 (E Emory Road). The highway then narrows to 2-lanes and leaves Halls Crossroads to pass through rural areas. It then becomes concurrent with SR 170 (Old Raccoon Valley Road) before crossing into Anderson County.

SR 170 splits off from US 441/SR 71 (Norris Freeway) along Hickory Valley Road before US 441/SR 71 continues north through rural areas to enter the city of Norris, where they have a short concurrency with SR 61 (Andersonville Highway/Charles G. Seviers Boulevard) before passing through Norris Dam State Park and crossing the Clinch River on top of the Norris Dam. The highway turns east and becomes windy and curvy as its crosses into Campbell County twice for short distances before re entering Anderson County to enter Rocky Top. US 441/SR 71 then have an interchange with I-75 (Exit 128) and widen to an undivided 4-lane shortly before coming to an end at an intersection with US 25W/SR 9/SR 116 (N Main Street) just north of downtown.

History 
In 1964, the City of Knoxville released a transportation study suggesting the construction of a controlled-access highway connecting downtown Knoxville to South Knoxville and John Sevier Highway (SR 168). Originally known as the South Knoxville Boulevard, the freeway planned for a crossing of the Tennessee River and two design alternatives, with Alternative A starting further east and passing through the Sevierville Pike area, and Alternative B starting at the end of Neyland Drive through Colonial Village. Both alternatives were to end at SR 168 and serve as a bypass of Chapman Highway.

Future

At this time, South Knox Boulevard (SR 71) ends at Sevierville Pike, although there are current plans to extend the road to meet US 441 (Chapman Highway) or SR 168 (Governor John Sevier Highway).

Junction list

See also
List of Tennessee state highways

References

071
Transportation in Sevier County, Tennessee
Transportation in Blount County, Tennessee
Transportation in Knox County, Tennessee
Transportation in Knoxville, Tennessee
Transportation in Anderson County, Tennessee
Transportation in Campbell County, Tennessee
Freeways in Tennessee